The 2014–15 Rayo Vallecano season is the club's 90th season in its history and its 16th in La Liga.

Squad statistics

Appearances and goals
Updated as of 30 May 2015.

|-
! colspan=14 style=background:#dcdcdc; text-align:center| Players who have made an appearance or had a squad number this season but have been loaned out or transferred

|}

Transfers

 

In:

Out:

Friendlies

Competitions

Overall

Primera División

League table

Matches
Kickoff times are in CET and CEST

Copa del Rey

Round of 32

References

Rayo Vallecano seasons
Rayo